Sander Solberg (born 12 May 1972) is a retired Norwegian football midfielder.

A prolific Norway U21 player, he also appeared in exhibition matches for Norway. He was almost signed by Heart of Midlothian F.C. in late 1997.

Ahead of the 2018 season he was hired as junior coach in Kråkerøy IL, and was subsequently hired as U16 coach of Sarpsborg 08 FF. Ahead of the 2022 season he went on to Fredrikstad's U16.

References

1972 births
Living people
Sportspeople from Fredrikstad
Norwegian footballers
Fredrikstad FK players
Viking FK players
Strømsgodset Toppfotball players
Moss FK players
Association football midfielders
Eliteserien players
Norway under-21 international footballers
Norway youth international footballers
Sarpsborg 08 FF non-playing staff
Fredrikstad FK non-playing staff